Carlos Alberto Oliva Argueta (born 28 July 1979) is a retired Honduran football player who currently works as an evangelical pastor.

Club career
Oliva started his career at Real C.D. España where he debuted on 21 February 1998 against Club Deportivo Olimpia. He went on to score 50 goals in the league for several clubs over a 10-year period until 2009.

He joined C.D. Victoria in the summer of 2009 only to return to C.D.S. Vida a year later. He retired in December 2012.

International career
Oliva played at the 1999 FIFA World Youth Championship in Nigeria.

He made his senior debut for Honduras in a May 2000 friendly match against Canada and has earned a total of 18 caps, scoring 3 goals. He has represented his country at the 2007 CONCACAF Gold Cup.

His final international was a February 2008 friendly match against Paraguay.

International goals
Scores and results list Honduras' goal tally first.

Evangelical work
During his time at Victoria, Oliva led a congregation in La Ceiba which was moved to Choloma where he preached every Monday. After retiring as a football player he worked for the Ministerio Apostólico Avance Misionero.

In August 2015, Oliva led the ceremony at the wedding of national team player Bryan Acosta.

References

External links

1979 births
Living people
People from San Pedro Sula
Association football midfielders
Honduran footballers
Honduras international footballers
2007 CONCACAF Gold Cup players
Real C.D. España players
C.D. Marathón players
F.C. Motagua players
Platense F.C. players
C.D.S. Vida players
C.D. Victoria players
Liga Nacional de Fútbol Profesional de Honduras players
Honduran evangelicals
Evangelical pastors